Anthony Yarde (born 13 August 1991) is a British professional boxer. He challenged for the WBO light-heavyweight title for the first time in 2019, and for the unified WBC, IBF and WBO titles in January 2023. He held the Commonwealth light-heavyweight title between 2021 and 2022.

Professional career
Yarde began boxing competitively at a relatively late age and only had twelve amateur fights prior to turning professional. In May 2015, he made his professional debut with a second-round knockout (KO) victory over Mitch Mitchell.

After compiling a record of 10–0 (9 KOs) he captured the Southern Area light-heavyweight title, dropping reigning champion Chris Hobbs to the canvas six times en route to a fourth-round technical knockout (TKO) victory on 20 May 2017 at the Copper Box Arena in London.

Two months later he defeated Richard Baranyi via first-round TKO on 8 July at the Copper Box Arena, capturing the WBO European light-heavyweight title.

He was scheduled to face Canadian boxer Ryan Ford, a former mixed martial artist, on 16 September 2017 for the vacant WBO Inter-Continental light-heavyweight title. Nobert Nemesapati was brought in as a replacement after Ford pulled out of the bout. After dropping his opponent to the canvas twice in the second round, Yarde captured his second regional title—retaining his WBO European title in the process—with a third-round stoppage via corner retirement (RTD).

Yarde vs. Kovalev
Yarde made three defences of his WBO regional titles and a further two defences of his WBO Inter-Continental title, winning all five by stoppage, before challenging Sergey Kovalev for the WBO light-heavyweight title on 24 August 2019 at the Traktor Sport Palace in Chelyabinsk, Russia. Yarde suffered the first defeat of his professional career, losing by TKO in the eleventh round. Yarde seemed comfortable in the early rounds, staying out of range and keeping Kovalev at bay with speed and movement. After six rounds of an even, back and forth contest, Yarde began landing accurate hooks to Kovalev's body in the seventh and eighth rounds that appeared to hurt the champion. In the last minute of the eighth, Yarde landed a straight-right to the head of Kovalev which had the veteran in trouble. Yarde followed up with an accurate salvo of power punches but was unable to capitalise, allowing the visibly hurt Kovalev to stay on his feet for the remainder of the round. After his success in the seventh and eighth rounds, Yarde appeared to tire and lose momentum in the ninth, allowing Kovalev to take control of the fight with combination punches and stiff jabs that began to frequently land on Yarde. The tenth round saw much of the same. In the final 20 seconds of the round, after being backed up against the ropes by Kovalev and being on the receiving end of a flurry of punches with no reply, Yarde was seemingly saved by the bell, which appeared to ring 8 seconds before the end of the round. In round eleven, sensing Yarde's fatigue, Kovalev upped the pressure and increased his punch output, eventually dropping Yarde with a spearing left-jab to win the fight by knockout. At the time of the stoppage, all three judges had Kovalev ahead with the scorecards reading 98–92, 97–94 and 96–93. In a post-fight interview with Steve Bunce for BT Sport, Kovalev praised Yarde's defence and boxing IQ, insisting Yarde will "100%" be a world champion in the future.

In his comeback fight, Yarde faced Diego Jair Ramirez on 8 February 2020 in a six rounder. Yarde, then ranked #7 by the WBO and #11 by the WBC knocked out his unranked opponent in two rounds.

In his next fight, Yarde fought Dec Spelman. Yarde looked a little rusty, but still managed to outperform his opponent, knocking him out in the sixth round of the contest, setting himself up for a shot at the vacant Commonwealth light-heavyweight title.

On 5 December 2020, Yarde, ranked #9 by The Ring and the WBC, #1 by the WBO and #10 by the IBF at light heavyweight faced Lyndon Arthur, who was ranked #6 by the WBO and the IBF for the Commonwealth light-heavyweight title. Arthur injured his right hand during the warm-up and utilized his jab for most of the fight. This would prove successful for Arthur, as he ended up winning the fight via split-decision, 115–114, 115–114 and 111–117.

On 28 August 2021, Yarde faced Colombian Alex Theran. In the first round, Yarde dropped Theran with a left hook to the body. Theran just survived the count, but succumbed to a second left hook to the body shortly afterwards. The fight ended 2 minutes and 32 seconds in to the first round.

On 4 December 2021, Yarde defeated Lyndon Arthur in their much anticipated rematch via knockout in the 4th round.

Professional boxing record

References

External links

Anthony Yarde profile at Frank Warren Promotions
Anthony Yarde – Profile, News Archive & Current Rankings at Box.Live

1991 births
Living people
People from Hackney Central
English male boxers
Boxers from Greater London
Light-heavyweight boxers
Commonwealth Boxing Council champions
Black British sportsmen